Following states have had Slovak Republic in their name:

 Slovakia, a current state that became an independent country by the dissolution of Czechoslovakia in 1993, sometimes also called the Second Slovak Republic
 Slovak Socialist Republic, a federal republic within Czechoslovakia from 1969 (losing the "Socialist" from the name in 1990)
 Slovak Republic (1939–1945), Germany's puppet ally during (and shortly before) World War II, also called the First Slovak Republic or the Slovak state  
 Slovak Soviet Republic, a short-lived communist state in south and eastern Slovakia in summer 1919

See also
 Slovak (disambiguation)
 Czechoslovak (disambiguation)